Precis milonia, the broad-banded commodore, is a butterfly in the family Nymphalidae. It is found in Nigeria, Cameroon, the Democratic Republic of the Congo, Uganda, Rwanda and Burundi. The habitat consists of primary lowland forests.

Subspecies
Precis milonia milonia — eastern Nigeria, Cameroon, Democratic Republic of the Congo
Precis milonia wintgensi Strand, 1909 — eastern Democratic Republic of the Congo, western Uganda, Rwanda, Burundi

References

Butterflies described in 1867
Junoniini
Butterflies of Africa
Taxa named by Baron Cajetan von Felder
Taxa named by Rudolf Felder